Gamma Virginis (γ Virginis, abbreviated Gamma Vir, γ Vir), officially named Porrima , is a binary star system in the constellation of Virgo. It consists of two almost identical main sequence stars at a distance of about 38 light-years.

Name
γ Virginis (Latinised to Gamma Virginis) is the star's Bayer designation.

The traditional name Porrima derives from Ancient Rome: Porrima, also known as Antevorta, was one of the Camenae or goddesses of prophecy. In 2016, the International Astronomical Union organized a Working Group on Star Names (WGSN) to catalog and standardize proper names for stars. The WGSN's first bulletin of July 2016 included a table of the first two batches of names approved by the WGSN; which included Porrima for this star.

In the catalogue of stars in the Calendarium of Al Achsasi Al Mouakket, this star was designated Laouiyet al Aoua, which was translated into Latin as Angulus Latratoris, meaning 'the angle of the barker'. This star, along with Beta Virginis (Zavijava), Eta Virginis (Zaniah), Delta Virginis (Minelauva) and Epsilon Virginis (Vindemiatrix), were Al ʽAwwāʼ, the Barker.

Properties
Gamma Virginis is a binary star, consisting of two stars of nearly equal apparent magnitudes 3.65 and 3.56, and of spectral type F0V. With an orbital period of 168.93 years, it was an easy object for amateur astronomers until the beginning of the 1990s, but in 2011 the smaller apparent distance between the stars requires a larger telescope or special techniques such as speckle interferometry, adaptive optics or optical interferometry to resolve the individual components. The last time they were at periapsis was in 1836. The distance became wide enough in 2020 to view with a small telescope. The star system has a combined apparent magnitude of 2.9. The system is 39 light-years away from the Sun.

Gamma Virginis is 2.8 degrees north of the ecliptic, so it can be occulted by the Moon and (rarely) by planets. In June 2011 Saturn passed a quarter of a degree south of Porrima.

Based upon X-ray emissions—an indicator of the strength of the stellar magnetic field—this system has an estimated age of 1.14 billion years.

Changes of distance and position angle
This table shows the apparent distance between the two stars and their relative position angle: the first three columns show data predicted from an orbit calculated in 1937, the next two columns show in 2006, the next three columns show observations reported by the Hanwell Community Observatory.

References 

Virginis, Gamma
Binary stars
Virginis, 029
Virgo (constellation)
F-type main-sequence stars
Porrima
061941
4825 6
110379 80
Durchmusterung objects
Am stars
0482